Magnesium transporter MRS2 homolog, mitochondrial is a protein that in humans is encoded by the MRS2 gene.

References

Further reading